Events in the year 1930 in Japan. It corresponds to Shōwa 5 (昭和5年) in the Japanese calendar.

Incumbents
Emperor: Hirohito
Prime Minister: Osachi Hamaguchi

Events
January 1 – The Ministry of Rail adopts the metric system for all of Japan's railways.
February 4 – Prince Takamatsu marries Kikuko Tokugawa.
February 20 –  1930 Japanese general election: The Rikken Minseitō party, led by Prime Minister Osachi Hamaguchi, won an overall majority in the House of Representatives. Voter turnout was 83.34%.
May 5 – Iwatani Industry has founded in Osaka. (As predecessor name was Iwatani Naoji Shoten) 
May 24–27 –  1930 Far Eastern Games held in Tokyo.
October 27–December –  Wushe Incident
November 14 – Prime Minister Osachi Hamaguchi is shot inside Tokyo Station by Tomeo Sagoya in a failed assassination  attempt. The wounds kept Hamaguchi hospitalized for several months.
November 18 – the Buddhist religious movement Soka Gakkai is formed by educator Tsunesaburō Makiguchi.
December 21 – The First Gōdō Bank and Sanyō Bank were merged, that became name for Okayama Chūgoku Bank. 
Unknown date
 According to All Japan Pachinko Association confirmed report, first standards pachinko parlor open in Nagoya.
 NHK Science & Technology Research Laboratories was founded

Births
January 4 – Minoru Makihara, businessman and CEO of Mitsubishi Corporation (d. 2020)
January 15 – Michiyo Aratama, actress (d. 2001)
January 16 – Shōmei Tōmatsu, photographer (d. 2012)
January 18 – Shōgorō Nishimura, film director (d. 2017)
January 20 – Sadateru Arikawa, aikido teacher (d. 2003)
January 29 – Norio Ohga, businessman and CEO of Sony (d. 2011)
April 23 – Shun Akiyama, literary critic (d. 2013) 
April 29 – Kyōko Kishida, actress (d. 2006)
May 20 – Yasushi Nagao, Pulitzer Prize-winning press photographer (d. 2009)
June 3 – Ben Wada, television director (d. 2011)
June 15 – Ikuo Hirayama, painter (d. 2009)
June 29 – Sachiko Hidari, actress (d. 2001)
July 3 – Kinji Fukasaku, film director (d. 2003)
August 1 – Satoru Kobayashi, film director (d. 2001)
September 12 – Akira Suzuki, chemist
October 8 – Tōru Takemitsu, composer (d. 1996)
October 10 – Akiyuki Nosaka, novelist, singer and politician (d. 2015)
November 10 – Michiya Mihashi, enka singer (d. 1996)
November 11 – Minako Oba, enka author and social critic (d. 2007)
December 10 – Yukio Koshimori, politician (d. 2005)
December 17 – Makoto Moroi, composer (d. 2013)
December 30 – Takeshi Kaikō, author (d. 1989)

Deaths
January 27 – Dewa Shigetō, admiral (b. 1856)
March 2 – Katsusaburō Yamagiwa, pathologist and physician (b. 1863)
March 10 - Misuzu Kaneko, poet (b. 1903)
March 28 – Uchimura Kanzō, author and pacifist (b. 1861)
May 10 – Kanzan Shimomura, nihonga painter (b. 1873)
May 13 – Katai Tayama, novelist (b. 1872)
June 30 – Yashiro Rokurō, admiral (1860)
July 19 – Oku Yasukata, Field Marshall (b. 1847)
October 30 – Sakichi Toyoda, inventor and industrialist (b. 1867)
November 4 – Akiyama Yoshifuru, general (b. 1859)
November 9 – Asano Sōichirō, businessman (b. 1848)
November 16 – Den Kenjirō, politician and Governor-General of Taiwan (b. 1855)

See also
1930 in Japanese football
List of Japanese films of the 1930s

References

 
1930s in Japan
Japan
Years of the 20th century in Japan